The Liga Nacional de Fútbol de Puerto Rico (LNF) was the first division association football league of Puerto Rico sharing D-1 status with Puerto Rico Soccer League. The LNF was founded on July 25, 2009 and the 2015 season featured six teams.

History
The league was founded on July 25, 2009 as the second division of the Puerto Rico Soccer League (PRSL), which was at that time the first division league of Puerto Rico. The Liga Nacional de Fútbol originally had 16 teams that were put into two groups of 8 (East Division and West Division) for the regular season.

The inaugural year began with Yabucoa Borikén taking on Maunabo Leones, as well as San Juan United taking on Club Deportivo Gallitos. Both games were held in Yabucoa. The Playoffs final had Maunabo Leones winning over Bayamón FC.

In 2010, the league size was increased to 21 teams divided into four divisions. The playoffs mixed the top teams in each division together.

During the 2011 season, there were 17 teams and the separate divisions were merged into one division.

In 2012, the league became the first division football league of Puerto Rico upon the folding of the Puerto Rico Soccer League.

Clubs

Former clubs
Aguilas Añasco (2010)
Atlético Parque FC (2010)
Club Deportivo Gallitos (2009–10)
Club Yagüez (2009–10)
Conquistadores de Guaynabo (2011)
Gigantes de Carolina FC (2010)
Guayanilla Pumas (2009–11)
High Performance FC (2009–10)
Real Atlantico (2011)
Roberto Cofresí (2010–11)
San Juan United (2009)
Spartans FC Puerto Rico (2009)
Sport for Nations (2010)
Yabucoa Borikén (2009–10)

See also

Puerto Rico Soccer League
List of Puerto Rican football champions

References

External links
Puerto Rico - List of Champions, RSSSF.com

 
2009 establishments in Puerto Rico
Sports leagues established in 2009
Defunct football leagues in Puerto Rico